Pine Dock Airport  is located  south of Pine Dock, Manitoba, Canada.

Pine Dock Airport is a public airport owned by Interlake Aviation / Lakeside Aviation. This  aircraft charter company services the Lake Winnipeg region which includes areas such as Berens River, Poplar River, Bloodvein River, and St. Theresa Point. Lakeside Aviation has an airport terminal and fuel tanks for jet and avgas (100LL) aviation fuel, and bases charter aircraft like its Cessna 206 aircraft there.

See also
Pine Dock Water Aerodrome

References

External links
Lakeside Aviation website

Registered aerodromes in Manitoba